Kruni Cove (‘Zaliv Kruni’ \'za-liv 'kru-ni\) is the 900 m wide cove indenting for 1.15 km the east coast of Robert Island in the South Shetland Islands, Antarctica.  It is entered south of Kitchen Point and north of Galiche Rock off Somovit Point.

The feature is named after the ancient Thracian town of Kruni in northeastern Bulgaria.

Location
Bulgarian mapping in 2009.

Maps
 L.L. Ivanov. Antarctica: Livingston Island and Greenwich, Robert, Snow and Smith Islands. Scale 1:120000 topographic map.  Troyan: Manfred Wörner Foundation, 2009.   (Updated second edition 2010.  )
 Antarctic Digital Database (ADD). Scale 1:250000 topographic map of Antarctica. Scientific Committee on Antarctic Research (SCAR). Since 1993, regularly upgraded and updated.

References
 Kruni Cove. SCAR Composite Antarctic Gazetteer.
 Bulgarian Antarctic Gazetteer. Antarctic Place-names Commission. (details in Bulgarian, basic data in English)

External links
 Kruni Cove. Copernix satellite image

Coves of Robert Island
Bulgaria and the Antarctic